Bidor (Chinese: 美羅) is a town and mukim in Batang Padang District, southern Perak, Malaysia.

Geography
Bidor is located 59 km southeast from state capital Ipoh and 116 km northwest of Kuala Lumpur.

It is south of Tapah, north of Sungkai, east of Changkat Jong and Teluk Intan, and west of the Titiwangsa Mountains.

History

Bidor and much of Perak were believed to be part of the Gangga Negara kingdom based on the historical artifacts that were discovered. It is believed that the area accepted Hindu-Buddhism around 900 years ago. The pioneer of the town was believed to be Syeikh Abdul Ghani who also became the village headman after the founding of the settlements.

Bidor was believed to have begun as a small village by the banks of Bidor River in the late 18th century. Local villagers transported goods using their sampans (boats) to neighbouring villages along the river towards Teluk Intan in Hilir Perak district.

Following the tin-mining boom in Perak, there was an influx of Chinese immigrants to Perak as a whole, including Bidor. The Hoklo (Hokkien-speaking) Chinese was believed to have originated from Teluk Intan. The influx of the Hakka and Cantonese came from Kinta Valley and Hulu Selangor. They came to Batang Padang to flee the Chinese triad wars and some of them were brought in to work in the newly opened tin mines of the area.

World War II 

Bidor was closely connected to the Battle of Kampar during the Japanese advancement southwards towards Kuala Lumpur. On 29 December 1941, 501 Battery withdrew to Bidor fleeing Kampar. The column was again dive-bombed and machine-gunned just south of Dipang. Five men were wounded. The last entry in the 137 Regt War Diary was for 31 December 1941, Lt Hartley's 30th birthday, when his battery and the other two of 137 Regt were all in the Bikam-Sungkai area.

In 1943, MPAJA's MPAJA 1st Patrol under the 5th Regiment was assigned to protect Col. John Davis who represent the Supreme Allied Commander, Admiral Lord Louis Mountbatten, who had just established the Head Office (HO) of Force 136 at Blantan Hill, some seven miles north-east of Bidor township. 1st Patrol was commanded by Huang Song (黃松) and his deputy Cai Dadi (蔡大地).

Communist Insurgency 

Captain D.G. Lock was killed while bathing near Bidor on 2 October 1948 (att. K.O.Y.L.I.). Captain A.R. Pickin was killed in action at Bidor on 18 July 1948. Both of them were buried at Batu Gajah Christian Cemetery. GHQ 26th Gurkha Infantry Brigade and the Royal Artillery's 95 Independent Field Battery (comprising "Charlie Troop" "Dog Troop" and "Command Troop") was stationed in Bidor in the 1950s to quell communist insurgency. After Malaya gained independence, Bidor was under the command of the local Royal Malaysian Police 3rd Battalion General Operations Forces (formally known as Police Field Force) who was stationed locally. This unit is famous with its elite Senoi Praaq unit; a special unit consists of Orang Asli (indigenous tribe) expert in tracking. The last 'black area' in Bidor, the Gepai Falls was finally opened to public in 1989 after a treaty was signed between Malaysian government and the Malayan Communist Party.

Economy

Bidor is a mainly industrial area. When one travels north of Bidor, one will see miles and miles of plantation on both side of the trunk road covered with lush greenery, guava, oil palm and rubber plantations.

An important source of income for the town, though, is (or used to be) from travellers who stop by the town for its well-known local delicacies and agricultural products.

Before the advent of North–South Expressway, travellers had no choice but to pass through this town through the federal trunk road. As this town is (still is) rather famous for its variety of food, travellers frequently choose to stop-by at one of the eateries before continuing their journey.

Kaolinite (kaolin), a type of clay was widely exploited in Bidor.

Food

The most famous food undoubtedly will be the duck-thigh noodles available at one of the local eateries that is the famous Pun Chun restaurant. The restaurant is located on the main street. Pun Chun is also famous for its 'Sat Kai Ma' (Chinese: 萨奇马) – a type of sweet dessert and also 'Kai Jai Peng' (Chinese：鸡仔饼) or known in English as the chicken biscuit, which are all locally-based Cantonese delicacies cooked or baked by local ethnic Chinese residents originating from the dominant Cantonese dialect group of the area.

At the morning wet market, there is a whole row of stalls, serving breakfast. One of the noodle-type food, chee cheong fun is pretty unusual. The wet market is also famous for wanton mee and fresh roast pork.

Bidor is also famous for its seedless guava and its durian. Stink beans Parkia speciosa or Petai is also sold at a reasonable price at new place of all trader sell directly to customer only 2 kilometres from Bidor town.

The most famous food attraction in Bidor is a coffee shop run by Ah Pu. One must not miss his Kopi Kau Special, which has a distinctive whiskey-liked after taste.

Restaurant Kari Kepala Ikan Noordin Bidor which is located not far from Ah Pu Coffee Shop is famous for their Nasi Kandar which cooked without Coconut Milk and only Natural Seasoning is used. When eating here, one must remember to use their hands to leave the fragrant curry aroma in their fingers, which can be used as an olfactory appetizer for the next few days.

Approximately 12 km from Bidor town towards on the road heading to Teluk Intan, there is located a Chinese new village where majority of its ethnic Chinese residents hail from the Hakka dialect group, called "Kampung Coldstream". The homemade "pan mee" sold in Kedai Kopi Kean Leong (located on the left side of the main road, grey building) is a must try. It is ideal for early goers as the shops operates as early as from 6.30 am up to its closing time 11 am. As for night goers, there's an old lady selling fried noodles on a bicycle just by the roadside during dinner time. Both dining spots are being widely popular among locals and outsiders alike.

Attractions

Gepai Waterfalls is noteworthy for those who prefer swimming, picnicking or photography. Gepai Waterfalls is also known as Lubuk Degong by the locals. It used to be a black area during the communist insurgency but was later opened to public in 1989 after the Communist Party of Malaya signed a peace treaty with the Malaysian government.

It was rumoured that the largest Botanical Gardens will be pioneered in Bidor. The plan was suggested by Sultan Nazrin Shah who was then Raja Muda and was strongly endorsed by the then-Perak Chief Minister, Tan Sri Dato' Seri Tajol Rosli Ghazali. However, the plan was put on hold when the Orang Asli (aborigines) opposed the plan. The plan was totally called off after the Perak state administration fell to Pakatan Rakyat as soon after the March 2008 general elections. The Orang Asli, who have got solid support from the new government agree to call off the plan totally.

Housing estates 
 Taman Aman
 Taman Anson
 Taman Batang Padang
 Taman Batang Padang Baru
 Taman Bidor Damansara 
 Taman Bidor Botani 
 Taman Bidor Intan
 Taman Bidor Jaya
 Taman Bidor Maju
 Taman Bidor Mewah
 Taman Bidor Putera
 Taman Bruseh
 Taman Bukit Bidor
 Taman Chit Loong
 Taman Daya
 Taman Desa Damai
 Taman Gemilang
 Taman Gemilang II
 Taman Maju Jaya
 Taman Malaysia
 Taman Megah
 Taman Intan Jaya
 Taman Kandiah
 Taman Kawan
 Taman Permai
 Taman Permata
 Taman Pun Chun
 Taman Puteri Indah
 Taman Putra
 Taman Sri Bidor
 Taman Seri Bunga
 Taman Seri Emas
 Taman Sivil
 Taman Syed Mahadzar

Schools 
 SRJK (C) Choong Hua
 SRJK (C) Choong Hua 2
 SRJK (C) Kuala Bikam
 SRJK (C) Pekan Pasir
 SRJK (C) Pin Min
 SRJK (C) Tanah Mas
 SRJK (C) Kampung Coldstream
 SRJK (T) Ladang Banopdane
 SRJK (T) Tun Sambanthan
 SK Bidor
 SK Jeram Mengkuang
 SK Kampung Poh
 SK Pos Gedong
 SK Seri Bidor
 SMJK (C) Choong Hua
 SMK Bidor
 SMK Syeikh Abdul Ghani
 SRJK. (T) Ladang Bidor Tahan

Infrastructure

3rd Battalion General Operations Forces Senoi Praaq, the home of one of the Royal Malaysian Police (RMP) elite forces are stationed on Jalan Tapah in Bidor.

Transportation

Car
By road, Bidor is 68 km from Ipoh and 138 km from Kuala Lumpur, using the Federal Route 1. The federal highway passes through Bidor town.

North–South Expressway Northern Route, 130 serves the city.

Public transportation
KTM Intercity narrowly misses Bidor town. The nearest railway stations are Tapah Road and Sungkai stations.

References

Batang Padang District
Mukims of Perak